Orten is a surname. Notable people with the surname include:

 Bjarne Orten (1919–2011), Norwegian civil servant
 Jiří Orten (1919–1941), Czech poet
 Helge Orten (born 1966), Norwegian politician

See also
 Jiří Orten Award, a Czech literary prize